Roylin Akiwo (born 26 June 2000) is a Palauan swimmer. She competed in the women's 50 metre backstroke event at the 2018 FINA World Swimming Championships (25 m), in Hangzhou, China.

References

2000 births
Living people
Palauan female swimmers
Female backstroke swimmers
Place of birth missing (living people)